KOLZ (102.9 FM) is a Top 40 (CHR) radio station  licensed to Kirtland, New Mexico. The station serves the Four Corners area and is currently owned by iHeartMedia, Inc. It features local programming, as well as programming from Premiere Networks, including the Elvis Duran & the Morning Show, Remix Top 30 Most Requested Live, the American Top 40 and On Air With Ryan Seacrest.

The station signed on in November 1999 as KAZX, playing Christmas music; aside from this stunt, the station has featured the "Star" contemporary hit radio format for its entire history. The KOLZ call sign was moved to this station from KABQ-FM in Corrales in 2021.

FM translator
KOLZ formerly relayed its signal to an FM translator broadcasting on 107.7 MHz in order to improve coverage in Durango. The license was cancelled on February 9, 2023.

References

External links

OLZ
Contemporary hit radio stations in the United States
Radio stations established in 2000
IHeartMedia radio stations
2000 establishments in New Mexico